Al-Okhdood Club Stadium, is a multi-use stadium in Najran, Saudi Arabia. It is currently used mostly for football matches, on club level by Al-Okhdood and Najran SC of the Saudi First Division. The stadium has a capacity of 8,000.

External links
slstat

Football venues in Saudi Arabia
Najran